The Journal of Bridge Engineering, is a peer-reviewed scientific journal about bridge engineering. It is published by the American Society of Civil Engineers.

Abstracting and indexing
Journal of Bridge Engineering is abstracted and indexed in the following bibliographic databases:

References

External links 
 

Monthly journals
English-language journals
Civil engineering journals
American Society of Civil Engineers academic journals